The 1990 Miami Redskins football team was an American football team that represented Miami University in the Mid-American Conference (MAC) during the 1990 NCAA Division I-A football season. In its first season under head coach Randy Walker, the team compiled a 5–5–1 record (4–3–1 against MAC opponents), finished in fifth place in the MAC, and were outscored by all opponents by a combined total of 225 to 200.

The team's statistical leaders included Jim Clement with 1,184 passing yards, Terry Carter with 858 rushing yards, and Milt Stegall with 590 receiving yards.

Schedule

References

Miami
Miami RedHawks football seasons
Miami Redskins football